Zelyonaya Dubrava is a rural locality (a settlement) in Kayaushinsky Selsoviet, Rodinsky District, Altai Krai, Russia. The population was 264 as of 2013. There are 5 streets.

Geography 
Zelyonaya Dubrava is located 30 km east of Rodino (the district's administrative centre) by road. Kochki is the nearest rural locality.

References 

Rural localities in Rodinsky District